Digi-TV was an American digital multicast television network that was launched in September 2021. It officially ceased broadcasting August 1, 2022. Initially launched in 30 TV markets, its programming consisted of general entertainment, knowledge, reality and lifestyle shows imported from Australia, Canada and the United Kingdom. Along with its availability on broadcast TV, it was also available via streaming video.

Programming
Programming on the channel included:
Bear's Wild Weekend
Biz Kid$: Young Entrepreneurs
Blue Heelers 
Britain's Best Bakery 
Celebrity Island with Bear Grylls 
City Homicide 
Country House Rescue
Country House Rescue Revisited  
The Gadget Show 
Garden Rescue 
Great British Menu 
The Great Interior Design Challenge 
The Island with Bear Grylls 
The Island with Bear Grylls UK Celebrity
James Martin Comforts 
Midsomer Murders
Obsessive Compulsive Cleaners
Perfect 
The Renovators 
The Restoration Man 
Wild Treks

References

External links
Official website

Television channels and stations established in 2021
2021 establishments in the United States
Television channels and stations disestablished in 2022
2022 disestablishments in the United States
Defunct television networks in the United States